Paresh Patel can refer to:

 Paresh Patel (cricketer) (born 1985), Indian cricketer
 Paresh Patel (field hockey) (born 1965), New Zealand field hockey player